Healey is a surname with several origins.  It is an English toponymic surname, from Healey near Manchester and possibly also from other places named Healey in Yorkshire and Northumberland.  It can also be an Irish name, originally from the Sligo area and the Gaelic word Ó hEalaighthe, which derives from 'ealadhach' meaning ingenious. The surname has a number of spelling variations, the most common being 'Healy'.

People with the surname Healey
 Adam Healey (born 1974), Italian internet entrepreneur
 Adrian Healey, English football commentator
 Alfred Healey (1875–1960), British olympic athlete
 Anne Healey (born 1951), American politician
 Arthur Daniel Healey (1889–1948), U.S. Representative of Massachusetts
 Austin Healey (born 1973), English rugby union player
 Beth Healey (born 1986/87), British medical doctor
 Chelsee Healey (born 1988), English actress
 Cherry Healey (born 1980), British television presenter
 Clive Healey (1918–1997), Australian politician
 Dan Healey (born 1957), Canadian historian
 Denis Healey (1917–2015), British politician
 Des Healey (1927–2009), Australian rules footballer
 Dick Healey (1923–2000), Australian politician
 Donald Healey (1898–1988), British rally driver & automotive engineer
 Dorothy Ray Healey (1914–2006), American Communist Party activist
 Ed Healey (1894–1978), American Football player
 Edna Healey (1918–2010), British author and film maker
Edward F. Healey (1885–1945), American politician
 Emma Healey (born 1991), Canadian writer and poet
 Eric Healey (born 1975), American ice-hockey player
 Gareth Healey (born 1971), British businessman
 Geoffrey Healey (1922–1994), British car designer, son of Donald
 Giles Healey (1901–1980), American cartographer
 Jack Healey (born 1938), American human rights activist
 James Healey (disambiguation), several people
 Jeff Healey (1966–2008), Canadian jazz and blues-rock guitarist
 John Healey (disambiguation), several people
 Joseph G. Healey (born 1938), American language researcher
 Kenneth Healey (1899–1985), 3rd Bishop of Grimsby, England
 Keri Healey, American voice actress
 Kerry Healey (born 1960), 70th Lieutenant Governor of Massachusetts
 Lori Healey, American real estate principal
 Mark Healey, British computer games developer
 Maura Healey (born 1971), 55th and current Attorney General of Massachusetts since 2015
 Michael Healey, Canadian actor and playwright
 Mitch Healey (born 1969), Australian rugby player and coach
 Myron Healey (1923–2005), American actor
 Nathan Healey (born 1980), Australian tennis player
 Nigel Healey, Vice Chancellor at Fiji National University
 Pat Healey (born 1985), American soccer player
 Patrick Healey Jr. (born 1968), American ten-pin bowler
 Patsy Healey (born 1940), professor at Newcastle University, England
 Paul Healey (born 1975), Canadian ice hockey player
 Philip B. Healey (1921–1996), New York politician
 Rich Healey (born 1938), Canadian ice hockey player
 Robert Healey (disambiguation), several people
 Ron Healey (1952–2018), English born Irish footballer
 Sarah Healey (born 1975), British civil servant
 Sheila Healey (1915–2007), Argentine painter
 Stephen Healey (1982–2012), British Army officer and footballer
 Steve Healey (born 1981), Professional Fisherman, Angler of the year 2010–2016
 T. J. Healey (Thomas J. Healey, 1866–1944), American racehorse trainer
 Theresa Healey, New Zealand actress
 Thomas J. Healey (born 1942), Harvard University lecturer
 Tom Healey (1853–1891), American MLB baseball player
 Trebor Healey, American poet and novelist
 William Healey, English football club owner

Characters
 Mike Healey, a fictional character from the Australian television soap opera Neighbours
 Roger Healey, a fictional character from the American sitcom I Dream of Jeannie

See also

 Healey (disambiguation)
 Healy (surname)

References

English-language surnames
Healey
English toponymic surnames